The Girl Who Loved a Soldier was an Australian stage play written by Wilton Welch. It has been credited as the first Australian play to be set in a city.

History 
Welch put the finishing touches to the play while he was engaged at the Adelphi Theatre, Sydney, playing the part of "Snoozle" in The Bad Girl of the Family.
It opened at the Adelphi on 27 July 1912 for George Marlow Ltd. and ran for three weeks; its last night was 16 August.
It was performed by Marlow's company in Melbourne the following year, opening at the Princess Theatre on 12 July 1913 to good reviews and closed on 25 July.

The play

Plot 
Wilfred Grant, the villain of the piece, is a wealthy stockbroker who seeks to marry Violet Donald, who finds him repulsive. In order to achieve his ends he falsifies her father's stock records to make him appear insolvent, but promises Violet he would assist him if she would marry him. She accedes for love of her father, but in a farcical scene is foiled by the Boy Scout, who disguises himself as the bride-to-be.
Richard Scott, the hero, is a gentleman in love with Violet, but could not propose because he has lost all his money through gambling and generosity, and to support himself has joined the army.
He designs a submarine, which is likely to make his fortune and so enable him to marry Violet. Grant, in an attempt to be rid of his rival, plants a bomb in the submarine, destroying it but Scott is unharmed, and gains the support of Colonel Anstruther. Grant is exposed as a fraud and saboteur, and is sentenced to imprisonment in Darlinghurst Gaol, from which he subsequently escapes. He is caught, however, and the troubles of the hero and heroine are over.

Programme 
ACT I.
Scene 1— The Grange, Darling Point, Sydney. Scene 2— The Main Gate, Victoria Barracks, Paddington. Scene 3— Wilfred Grant's Flat, Macquarie-street

ACT II.
Scene 1 — The Drawingroom, The Grange. Scene 2 — Queen's-square, Sydney, Scene 3— The Main Gate, Victoria Barracks. Scene 4— St. Andrew's Cathedral, Sydney.

ACT III.
Scene 1— The Barracks Square, Victoria Barracks. Scene 2— Man o' War Steps, Farm Cove, Sydney. Scene 3— Submarine Headquarters, Chowder Bay. Scene 4— The Great Scenic Tableau. Under Sydney Harbor. The Wrecked Submarine.

ACT IV.
Scene 1— The Exercise Yard, Darlinghurst Gaol. Scene 2— The Outside of Darlinghurst Gaol. Scene 3— A Street near the Gaol. Scene 4 — The Grange, Darling Point.

Cast 
Sydney:
Richard Scott (the soldier):  Hugh Buckler
Violet Donald (the girl):  Violet Paget
Angas Donald (retired squatter):  John Dunce
Colonel Anstruther:  Charles Lawrence
Wilfred Grant:  (the villain)  Godfrey Cass
Shadder Bloggs: (rabbit vendor)  D'Arcy Kelway
Olga Lazaroff: (a foreign spy)  Jennie Pollock
Isaac Rubenstein:  Frank Reis
Toby Trackem (Boy Scout):  Wilton Welch
Lily Lovell (Girl Guide):  Elwyn Harvey

Melbourne:
Richard Scott (the soldier):  George Cross
Violet Donald (the girl):  Essie Clay
Colonel Anstruther:  Wernham Ryott
Wilfred Grant:  T. W. Lloyd
Shadder Bloggs:  Marcus St John
Olga Lazaroff:  Agnes Keogh
Isaac Rubinstein:  Frank Reis
Toby Trackem (Boy Scout):  Frank Crossley
Lily Lovell (Girl Guide):  Florence Gleeson

Reviews
Reviewers found the play a typical melodrama that breaks no new ground, but enjoyable nonetheless; with the usual thrills and unlikely situations, a dash of humor and a satisfying conclusion. The play was well performed to good houses.
Another reviewer poked gentle fun at the incongruities, absurdities and ridiculous situations, giving warm praise to several actors, and greatest recommendation to the scene paintings by A. and G. Clint and J. S. Mann, in an era when stage scenery was an important art form.

References 

Australian plays
Melodramas
1912 plays